Andrew Belle is an American singer-songwriter. Belle currently resides in Chicago, IL – although he has lived in both Nashville and Los Angeles in recent years. He has toured alongside many accomplished artists such as Mat Kearney, Ben Rector, Allen Stone, The Milk Carton Kids, Joshua Radin, Brett Dennen, Leagues, and Diane Birch. Andrew is also a member of the critically acclaimed songwriter collective Ten Out of Tenn.

Career

2008–2009: Beginnings and All Those Pretty Lights EP

Shortly after graduating from college, Belle began performing in bars and small clubs around his hometown of Chicago such as Schubas Tavern and SPACE. In September 2008, Belle released his debut EP All Those Pretty Lights.

2010–2012: In My Veins, The Ladder, and The Daylight EP
In February 2010, Andrew released his debut full-length album The Ladder and saw immediate success in TV/Film licensing. His songs began to be regularly featured on American television shows such as Grey's Anatomy, Castle, Pretty Little Liars, One Tree Hill, and The Vampire Diaries. In May 2010, released a b-side single from The Ladder recording sessions entitled "In My Veins (feat. Erin McCarley)" that was played during an iconic scene of the Grey's Anatomy season six finale; generating more than 100 million streams and downloads of the "In My Veins" single worldwide. This song was also used in the culminating scene of the season four finale of Castle in 2012 and in one of the ending scenes of the show Cold Case. It was also used in season six of Castle and at the two main characters' wedding in season seven of the show.

It was during this time that Belle began touring nationally as a member of the Nashville based singer-songwriter collective Ten Out of Tenn – alongside his peers Joy Williams, Mikky Ekko, Ashley Monroe, Trent Dabbs, Katie Herzig, Erin McCarley, K.S. Rhoads, Madi Diaz, Matthew Perryman Jones, Butterfly Boucher, Gabe Dixon, Tyler James, Sarah Siskind, and Griffin House.

Shortly after this initial success, his song "Sky's Still Blue" was featured in a Microsoft commercial promoting the Windows Phone 7. It was made available as a free download from Microsoft. The track was later included on an EP entitled The Daylight which was released in February 2012.

2013–2015: Black Bear
On his second full-length album Black Bear, Belle wrote songs that were autobiographical, with themes ranging from wrestling with God to restoring personal relationships. The album consists of ambitious, ambient songs with influences from M83, Beach House, James Blake, and Washed Out. On the process of creating the record, he said: "I began to feel limited by my original, predominately acoustic sound, [...] and as my creative taste began to change, I decided to take things in a new direction; writing songs that made me excited about music again". Black Bear was released in August 2013 and was produced in Norman, OK by Chad Copelin. Belle stated in an interview with USA Today that he wrote the album's first single "Pieces" for his wife shortly after they were married in 2012.

In the fall of 2014, Belle released an EP entitled Black Bear (Hushed), featuring stripped down versions of five of the album's tracks. It also included a remix of the song "Black Bear" by artist and producer Shallou.

2016–2018: Dive Deep
In August 2016, Belle released "Dive Deep" as the lead single from his upcoming third album of the same name. A follow-up single, "You", was put out in October 2016. These were followed by 3 more singles – "Down", "Honey and Milk", and "When the End Comes" – before his third full-length album Dive Deep was ultimately released on August 25, 2017. Similarly to Black Bear, it was recorded in Norman, OK with producer Chad Copelin and debuted on the Billboard Heatseekers Albums chart at position No. 8, after which Belle embarked on a nearly completely sold out headline tour of the U.S supporting his latest work.

In the fall of 2018, Belle released an EP entitled Dive Deep (Hushed), featuring stripped down versions of five of the album's tracks, similar to the Black Bear (Hushed) EP released in 2014. In winter the same year, he directly supported Mat Kearney on his Crazytalk U.S tour alongside Austrian artist and producer Filous.

2021: Nightshade 
On June 11, Belle release the first single "My Poor Heart" from the forthcoming album Nightshade. He released the second single "Spectrum" on July 10, and the third single "Nightshade" on 30 July. The album Nightshade was released on August 20.

Personal life 
Andrew Belle grew up in Wheaton, Illinois and graduated with a marketing degree from Taylor University in 2006. He now lives in Chicago with his wife and children.

Discography

Studio albums
The Ladder (2010)
Black Bear (2013)
Dive Deep (2017)
Nightshade (2021)

EPs
All Those Pretty Lights (2008)
The Daylight (2012)
Black Bear (Hushed) (2014)
Dive Deep (Hushed) (2018)

Singles
Back for Christmas (2016)
Fade into You (2018)
If I Knew How to Hold You (2020)
To Be Alone (2020)
Whatever Happened to Christmas (2020)

Awards and nominations

References

External links 

Live!
All That Jazz – Kristin Baird Rattini
Andrew Bird vs. Andrew Belle: Two Chicago indie performers

American singer-songwriters
American male singer-songwriters
American rock singers
American rock songwriters
Writers from Wheaton, Illinois
Living people
1984 births
21st-century American male singers
21st-century American singers